MacIsaac is a surname. Notable people with the surname include:

 Angus MacIsaac (born 1943), English educator and businessman
 Angus MacIsaac (footballer) (1900-1944) Australian rules footballer
 Ashley MacIsaac (born 1975), Canadian fiddler
 Dave MacIsaac (born 1955), Canadian musician
 Dugald MacIsaac (1901-1961), Scottish chess player
 , Canadian zoologist
 Martha MacIsaac (born 1984), Canadian actress
 Rob MacIsaac (born 1962), Canadian politician